Oleg Mikhaylovich Dmitriyev (Oleg Mihajlovič Dmitrijev; July 1, 1937 in Omsk – December 9, 1993 in Moscow) was a Russian Soviet poet and translator. In 1959 he graduated from the MSU Faculty of Journalism. By then he wrote many books, his first one titled Hostel in 1962. He was a member of the Union of Soviet Writers.

References
 Творчество поэта Олега Дмитриева

1937 births
1993 deaths
Moscow State University alumni
Russian male poets
Soviet male poets
Soviet poets